Robert Wilschrey (born 27 June 1989) is a German footballer who plays as a midfielder for SC Kapellen-Erft.

Career
Wilschrey made his professional debut for Alemannia Aachen in the 3. Liga on 10 November 2012, coming on as a substitute in the 28th minute for Christian Weber in the 0–3 home loss against Hallescher FC.

References

External links
 Profile at DFB.de
 Profile at kicker.de
 SC Kapellen-Erft statistics at Fussball.de
 Alemannia Aachen II statistics at Fussball.de

1989 births
Living people
Sportspeople from Neuss
Footballers from North Rhine-Westphalia
German footballers
Association football midfielders
Alemannia Aachen players
3. Liga players
21st-century German people